Where on Earth Is Carmen Sandiego? was an American live action animated television series based on the series of computer games. The show was produced by DIC Productions L.P. and originally aired from 1994 to 1999, on Saturday mornings during FOX's Fox Kids Network block. Reruns aired on the Qubo television network from June 9, 2012 (alongside Animal Atlas) to May 26, 2018.

The series won a Daytime Emmy Award for Outstanding Children's Animated Program in 1995, and in the same year was spun-off into a Where in the World-styled video game entitled Carmen Sandiego Junior Detective. Its theme song uses the melody from the chorus "Singt dem großen Bassa Lieder" ("Sing Songs of the Great Pasha") from Mozart's opera Die Entführung aus dem Serail (The Abduction from the Seraglio).

History

Production and broadcast (1994–1999)

The script for every Earth episode had to meet the approval of Broderbund, which created and, at the time, owned the Carmen franchise. Their cause for concern was the level of the violence on other FOX children's shows such as X-Men and Mighty Morphin Power Rangers. Broderbund did not require this of the creators of the World and Time game shows that aired on PBS, presumably since PBS, as the distributor of such shows as Sesame Street, had a long-standing reputation for non-violent educational children's programming. The lead characters of Earth were featured in Carmen Sandiego Junior Detective, released in 1995. The opening theme song for the show is "Singt dem großen Bassa Lieder" from Wolfgang Amadeus Mozart's Die Entführung aus dem Serail, with new lyrics, pop instrumentation, and a backbeat. The Rainbow Animation Group (later renamed Galaxy World, Inc., not to be confused with the Italian studio Rainbow S.p.A.), and Han Yang Productions contributed some animation for this series.

Home media releases
Fox Video originally released the series on VHS through their Fox Kids Video label, which contained two episodes each.

In November 2001, Lions Gate Home Entertainment and Trimark Home Video released two VHS tapes, Carmen's Revenge and Time Traveler, consisting of the show's three-part episodes ("Retribution" and "Labyrinth") in a feature-length format. Time Traveller was also released on DVD, and alongside the "Labyrinth" episode, also came with a demo of Where in the World is Carmen Sandiego? Treasures of Knowledge. A video of the episode "Timing is Everything" was included with some versions of the mentioned game.

In September 2003, Sterling Entertainment released Into the Maelstrom and No Place like Home on VHS and DVD. Into the Maelstrom contained the three part "Retribution" episode, while No Place like Home contained the episode "The Remnants" and the two-part episode "Can You Ever Go Home Again?" The DVD versions contained "When it Rains..." and "Follow My Footprints" as bonus episodes, respectively. NCircle Entertainment reissued both DVDs in 2007.

In June 2006, Shout! Factory and Sony BMG Music Entertainment released the first season on DVD. Due to poor sales, no further seasons were released.

Mill Creek Entertainment released Where on Earth Is Carmen Sandiego? – The Complete Series on DVD in Region 1 on February 21, 2012. This four-disc set contains all forty episodes of the series. They also released a ten-episode best-of collection the same day. These releases have been discontinued and are now out of print. Mill Creek re-released the complete series on DVD in Region 1 in June 2017.

PIDAX, a German company, released the complete series on DVD for Region 2 in 3 Volumes in 2019 in English and German.

The whole series is available to stream on Paramount+.

Plot
Following the plot of the Carmen Sandiego franchise, Earth sees international thief Carmen Sandiego (voiced by Rita Moreno) lead the organization V.I.L.E. in stealing treasures from around the world and leaving clues behind for ACME agents Zack (voiced by Scott Menville) and Ivy (voiced by Jennifer Hale), under the guidance of the Chief (voiced by Rodger Bumpass), to find, in order to capture her. In this version, Carmen Sandiego is a former agent of ACME who left to seek a greater challenge, and has a strong code of ethics when stealing items. The Player is an unseen live-action character who bookends acts by communicating with Carmen; it is implied that to them the television series is a video game that they are playing from a computer.

While Carmen is originally presented as the show's antagonist, she becomes more like an anti-hero as the series progresses; she even helps Zack and Ivy against mutual enemies.

Characters

Main characters
 Carmen Sandiego (voiced by Rita Moreno) – An international thief and the head of V.I.L.E. Despite the name of her organization, she has a strong code of morals and only steals for the challenge of it. She was a former agent of the ACME Detective Agency.
 Chief (voiced by Rodger Bumpass) – The head of ACME. Short for Computerized Holographic Imaging Educational Facilitator, his role consisted of providing exposition, information, alerts of Carmen's recent crime, and comic relief. He had a very intimate professional and personal relationship with Carmen. He once also had a robotic body while working with Carmen back when she was still part of the ACME Detective Agency.
 Ivy (voiced by Jennifer Hale) – A young woman who has short red hair and green eyes. She and Carmen seem to have a past history, although it is only hinted at in the series. Her skills include having multiple black belts in martial arts and being an expert pilot. She can get frustrated easily, such as hating it when Zack calls her "sis" or when Carmen is getting away.
 Zack (voiced by Scott Menville) – Ivy's younger brother, who has blond hair and blue eyes. He takes cases less seriously than his sister Ivy. Zack's jacket has his name misspelled as Zak.
 Player (portrayed by Jeffrey Tucker in season 1, Justin Shenkarow in season 2, Asi Lang and Joanie Pleasant in seasons 3–4) – The only live-action character on the program, always seen from behind as a computer user at the beginning and ending of the show. They are the ones who transport Zack and Ivy to their locations and summon ACME detectives to their aid.

ACME detectives
The following are ACME detectives who assist Zack and Ivy:

 Aileen (voiced by Janice Kawaye) – A Hawaiian detective. Her older brother, Max, is a TV news reporter ("Curses, Foiled Again").
 Amati – A Black detective and archaeologist ("A Higher Calling," "Follow My Footprints").
 Armando Arguella – An Argentinian detective and gaucho ("The Good Old Bad Old Days," "Scavenger Hunt," "Just Like Old Times," "Can You Ever Go Home Again?"  2).
 Billy Running Bird – A Native American detective ("Shaman Spirits").
 Chester – An young American detective and amateur ornithologist ("Birds of a Feather").
 Gro (voiced by Chadwick Pelletier) – A Norwegian detective and friend of Zack ("Retribution" Pt. 2).
 Jasmine – A Jamaican detective ("Skull and Double-Crossbones").
 Josha – An American detective and computer expert ("Retribution" Pt. 3, "The Trial of Carmen Sandiego," "Cupid Sandiego," "Can You Ever Go Home Again?" Pt. 1). He has a crush on, and later dates, Ivy.
 Ketut – An Indonesian detective from Bali who enjoys hang-gliding ("Hot Ice").
 Li – A detective from Macao ("Skull and Double-Crossbones," "Can You Ever Go Home Again?" Pt. 2).
 Maria (voiced by Kath Soucie) – A Brazilian detective from ACME's Rio de Janeiro office who seems to have a crush on Zack ("Music to My Ears").
 Marco – An Italian detective and friend of Ivy ("Split Up").
 Michelle – A young African American Space Camp Florida participant ("Moondreams") and later ACME detective ("Follow My Footprints").
 Reggis and Barrow – A team of Black/White British detectives ("Just Like Old Times").
 Tatiana (voiced by Candi Milo) – A Russian ACME detective whom Zack has a crush on ("Just Like Old Times," "Scavenger Hunt," "Can You Ever Go Home Again?" Pt. 2).
 Wahidullah – An Afghan detective ("Birds of a Feather").

V.I.L.E. agents
The following are agents who work for Carmen Sandiego's organization, V.I.L.E.:

 Al Loy – A hotheaded American metallurgist ("A Date with Carmen"  1&2, "All for One"). His name is a play on "alloy."
 Archie Ology – A white American archaeologist ("Follow My Footprints," "The Trial of Carmen Sandiego"). His name is a play on "archaeology."
 Auntie Bellum – A white American agent from the South ("Timing Is Everything"). Her name is a play on "Antebellum."
 Buck N. Bronco – A white American agent from the West ("The Good Old Bad Old Days"). His name is a play on "bucking bronco."
 Clair E. Net and Cora Net (both voiced by Kath Soucie) – White American twin sister musicians: Clair is a singer, while Cora is a pianist and electric guitarist. They were once "busted in a lip-synching scandal" ("Music to My Ears"). Their names are plays on "clarinet" and "cornet."
 Clay Tandoori – An Indian agent ("Dinosaur Delirium," "Labyrinth" Pt. 1). His name is a reference to tandoors, traditionally made of clay.
 Dara Riska – An equally hotheaded white American agent and rival of Al Loy ("All for One"). Her name is apparently a play on "dare a risk."
 Dee Tritus – A white American gemologist ("Hot Ice"). Her name is a play on "detritus."
 Four Chin Hunter – An Asian American treasure hunter ("A Higher Calling," "A Date with Carmen" Pt. 1). His name is a play on "fortune hunter."
 Frank M. Poster – A white British master of disguise ("By a Whisker," "Birds of a Feather"). His name is a play on "frank impostor."
 Hannah Lulu – A superstitious Hawaiian agent ("Curses, Foiled Again"; "Can You Ever Go Home Again?" Pt. 2). Her name is a play on "Honolulu."
 Lars Vegas – A greedy, vain white American agent ("Follow My Footprints," "Just Like Old Times," "Cupid Sandiego"). His name is a play on "Las Vegas."
 Lee Galese – Carmen Sandiego's lawyer, who acts as executor of her estate in "Follow My Footprints" and as her defense attorney in "The Trial of Carmen Sandiego." His name is a play on "legalese."
 Moe Skeeter – A bumbling white American agent who always appears with Lars Vegas ("Follow My Footprints," "Just Like Old Times," "Cupid Sandiego"). His name is a play on "mosquito."
 Paige Turner – A white American literature expert ("Chapter and Verse"). Her name is a play on "page-turner."
 Pearl Diver – An American underwater diver ("A Date with Carmen" Pts. 1&2).
 Pop A. Wheelie and Iggy Nition – A team of white American agents and motorcyclists ("The Remnants"). Their names are plays on "pop a wheelie" and "ignition."
 R.B. Traitor – Supposedly a judge turned criminal who hunts crooks down and sentences them to a secret jail while stealing their loot, he is in fact a V.I.L.E. agent assisting Carmen by using Zack and Ivy to lead her past security measures to her desired loot, an original copy of the Magna Carta ("The Trial of Carmen Sandiego"). His name is a play on "arbitrator."
 Rip Shipoff – A white pirate who has a pet parrot ("Skull and Double-Crossbones"). His name seems to mean "rip off a ship."
 Stu L. Pijin – A bird trainer ("Birds of a Feather"). His name is a play on "stool pigeon."
 Touriste Classé – A French "international con man and master art thief" ("The Stolen Smile," "Labyrinth" Pt. 1). His name is a play on "tourist class."
 A substantial number of unnamed henchmen who work for Carmen Sandiego and other V.I.L.E. agents. They wear head-to-toe blue outfits with goggles and boots and appear in most episodes.
 An unnamed pair of agents, one man and one woman, presumably Chinese, whose hideout is a junk on the Yangtze River. Each has a tattoo of half of a yin and yang symbol, and the man has a pet cormorant ("Moondreams").

Other villains
As Carmen Sandiego became less villainous and evolved into more of an antihero, other characters began to fill her original role as the show's antagonist. The following villains are:

 Dr. Sara Bellum – Carmen Sandiego's former robotics and computer expert ("Split Up," "Chapter and Verse"). She betrays V.I.L.E., impersonating Carmen in an attempt to become known as the world's greatest thief ("When It Rains"), but later appears to be a V.I.L.E. member again ("Follow My Footprints"). Her name is a play on "cerebellum."
 Ira Gation (voiced by Michael Earl) – Sara's sole henchperson during her time away from V.I.L.E. ("When It Rains"). His name is a play on "irrigation."
 Dr. Gunnar Maelstrom (voiced by Tim Curry) – A hostile and extremely violent criminal who considers Carmen Sandiego his archenemy. As an ACME detective, Carmen pursued him and eventually put him in prison following his attempt to steal the wreck of the Titanic. Years later, following his escape from prison and apparent death, Carmen had come to consider him a rolemodel, but his escape was in fact part of a plot for revenge on her ("Retribution" Pts. 1–3). His last name is a reference to maelstroms, a term for powerful oceanic whirlpools.
 Bilge – Maelstrom's lead henchman ("Retribution" Pts. 1–3).
 Mason Dixon – A V.I.L.E. agent and avowed Southerner who resents Carmen's success. In 1989, the two were partners in an art theft in Amsterdam, but Mason was arrested and Carmen escaped when he turned the wrong way down a street and was captured by police. He uses her time machine to change the outcome of that incident, allowing him to take over V.I.L.E. and leaving Carmen exceedingly meek, and to attempt to overturn the outcome of the Civil War ("Timing Is Everything"). His name is a reference to the Mason–Dixon line.
 Lee Jordan (voiced by David Coburn) – The first ACME agent to have captured Carmen Sandiego, he was among ACME's most accomplished employees, making him arrogant and womanizing. Embittered by his fame and the lack of challenge in fighting crime, he left ACME and helped Carmen Sandiego escape in order to train to be a V.I.L.E. agent. However, his impulsive and violent nature clashed greatly with Carmen's more refined, pacifistic approach, leading her to fire him ("Boyhood's End" Pts. 1&2). Infuriated, he sought revenge on her, eventually kidnapping Malcolm Avalon, a businessman she believed to be her birth father, in order to blackmail her into stealing for him ("Can You Ever Go Home Again?" Pts. 1&2).
 Cruiser – Lee Jordan's lead henchman ("Can You Ever Go Home Again?" Pts. 1&2).

Episodes

Cast

 Rita Moreno as Carmen Sandiego
 Jennifer Hale as Ivy
 Scott Menville as Zack
 Rodger Bumpass as the Chief
 Justin Shenkarow as the Player (season 1)
 Jeffrey Tucker as the Player (season 2)
 Asi Lang as Player #1 (seasons 3–4)
 Joanie Pleasant as Player #2 (seasons 3–4)

Additional voices

 James Avery
 Yoshio Be
 Jim Belushi – Paul Revere ("A Date with Carmen"  1&2)
 Susan Blu
 Bettina Bush
 Rocky Carroll
 Kevin Castro 
 David Coburn – Lee Jordan ("Boyhood's End" Pts. 1&2, "Can You Ever Go Home Again?" Pts. 1&2)
 Jesse Corti
 Tim Curry – Dr. Gunnar Maelstrom ("Retribution" Pts. 1–3)
 Shelly DeSai
 Grisha Dimant
 Feisha Dimetros
 Michael Earl – Ira Gation ("When it Rains")
 Jeannie Elias
 Dave Fennoy
 Efrain Figueroa
 John Garry
 Brian George
 Dan Gilvezan
 Fernanda Gordon
 Kevin Guillaume
 Alaina Reed Hall
 Clayton Halsey
 Jamie Hanes
 Dorian Harewood
 Jess Harnell
 Karen Hartman
 Phil Hayes 
 Hector Herrera
 Amy Hill
 Vien Hong
 Michael Horse
 Patricia Van Ingen
 Robert Ito
 Marabina Jaimes
 Nick Jameson
 Marcia Jeffries
 Jamie Kaplan
 Janice Kawaye – Aileen ("Curses, Foiled Again")
 Gene Kidwell

 Clyde Kusatsu
 Alexander Kusnetzsrv
 Maurice LaMarche
 Joe Lala
 Frederick Lopez
 Danny Mann
 Dawn McMillan
 Sidney Miller
 Candi Milo – Tatiana ("Rules of the Game")
 Pat Musick
 Humberto Ortiz
 Laurel Page
 Samantha Paris
 Chadwick Pelletier – Gro ("Retribution" Pt. 2)
 Stan Phillips
 Matt Plendl
 Phil Proctor
 Lisa Raggio
 Don Reed
 Frank Renzulli
 Kevin Michael Richardson
 Robbie Rist
 Brogan Roche
 Eugene Roche
 Sean Roche
 Roger Rose
 John Rubinow
 Marco Sanchez
 Brandon Scott
 Alan Shearman
 Stacy Sibley
 Susan Silo
 Jane Singer
 Kath Soucie – Maria, Claire E. Net, Cora Net ("Music To My Ears")
 David H. Sterry
 Michael Su
 Russi Taylor
 Dierk Torsek
 Frank Welker
 Ian Whitcomb
 Reuven Bar Yotam

Critical reception
The show was given a rating of 4 stars out of 5 by Common Sense Media, noting that the format of the show – which includes trivia sessions between acts, vocabulary definitions, and the use of foreign languages – is "designed to pique kids' interest in these subjects". DVD Talk noted that the show exceeded the obligatory action of comedy of a cartoon, by respecting its audience with an intelligent sensibility rarely seen in children's television.

References

External links
 

Earth
1990s American animated television series
Television series by DIC Entertainment
1994 American television series debuts
1999 American television series endings
Fox Broadcasting Company original programming
American children's animated action television series
American children's animated adventure television series
American children's animated education television series
American children's animated mystery television series
American children's animated science fiction television series
English-language television shows
Fox Kids
Daytime Emmy Award for Outstanding Animated Program winners
American animated television spin-offs
Animated series based on video games
Television shows set in San Francisco
American detective television series
American television series with live action and animation
Works set in computers